Wróble may refer to several places:
 Wróble, Podlaskie Voivodeship
 Wróble, Warmian-Masurian Voivodeship
 Michałowo-Wróble

See also 
 Wróblewski